The  is a Japanese commission which comes under the authority of the Financial Services Agency. It is responsible for “ensuring fair transactions in both securities and financial futures markets.”

Its current Chairman is Mitsuhiro Hasegawa, who assumed the post in 2017. There are two chairmen, Shinya Fukuda, and Masayuki Yoshida.

History
The SESC was formally established on July 20, 1992, in the wake of a number of 1991 scandals related to securities companies. In June 1998, the Financial Supervisory Agency and the SESC were split off from the Ministry of Finance, and the Financial Supervisory Agency became the Financial Services Agency.

Structure
The SESC has five objectives, and a division to handle each one:
 Market Surveillance
 Compliance Inspection
 Disclosure Document Inspection
 Administrative Civil Monetary Penalties Investigation
 Enforcement-Investigation and Filing Criminal Charges

Criticisms
Unlike the U.S. Securities and Exchange Commission, the SESC doesn't have the power to punish those who violate the law or regulations. Instead, it reports its findings to the cabinet, prosecutors, and the Financial Services Agency with recommendations. In addition to which, it has been described as understaffed - as of 2004, the SESC had 444 staff, as compared to 3100 at the US SEC. The total number of SESC staff had increased to 697 as of fiscal year 2010.

References

External links 
 Securities and Exchange Surveillance Commission 
 Securities and Exchange Surveillance Commission 

Japan
Cabinet Office (Japan)
Japanese